Now Deh (also known as Now Deh-e Qarah Bāghī) is a village in Chah Dasht Rural District, Shara District, Hamadan County, Hamadan Province, Iran. At the 2006 census, its population was 231, in 63 families.

References 

Populated places in Hamadan County